Taman Tun Sardon is a residential neighbourhood within the city of George Town in Penang, Malaysia. In all, 22 housing blocks were constructed within the neighbourhood to cater to the needs of lower-income citizens.

Etymology 
Taman Tun Sardon was named in honour of Sardon Jubir, a Johor-born politician who served as the Governor of Penang between 1975 and 1981.

Transportation 
Jalan Hilir Pemancar runs through Taman Tun Sardon, making it the main thoroughfare within the neighbourhood. Residents within the neighbourhood are also served by Rapid Penang bus routes 206 and 302, which include stops along the road.

Education 
A single high school, SMK Datuk Haji Mohd Nor Ahmad, is located within Taman Tun Sardon.

See also 
 Minden Heights
 Gelugor

References 

Neighbourhoods in George Town, Penang